"Sjumilakliv" is a song written by Martin and David Stenmarck, and recorded by Martin Stenmarck on his 2006 album 9 sanningar och en lögn as well as released as a single the same year. The song topped the Swedish singles chart, and a Bassflow remix was later released. The song was awarded a Grammis Award for "Song of the year 2006" and a Rockbjörnen award in the "Swedish song of the year" category.

On 8 October 2006, the song topped Svensktoppen and on 28 October the same year it also topped Trackslistan. The single sold platinum twice.

At Dansbandskampen 2010, the song was performed by Wizex.

Charts

References

2006 singles
Martin Stenmarck songs
Number-one singles in Sweden
Universal Music Group singles
2006 songs